Isabella Ramsay (born 12 July 1987) is a Swedish professional golfer who played on the Ladies European Tour.

Career
Ramsay turned professional in 2006 and joined the Swedish Golf Tour (SGT) in 2007. She won her first two SGT events in 2012, and joined the LET Access Series in 2013.

In the 2014 LET Access Series, she won the Kristianstad Åhus Ladies PGA Open and the Royal Belgian Golf Federation LETAS Trophy, and graduated to the Ladies European Tour as one of the top-5 on the Order of Merit along with Daisy Nielsen, Lina Boqvist, Tonje Daffinrud and Emma Westin.

Her best LET finish was T9 at the 2016 Aberdeen Asset Management Ladies Scottish Open, which also qualified her for the 2016 Women's British Open, where she did not make the cut. She comfortably kept her card by finishing the rankings 54th in 2016 and 77th in 2017.

In 2018, Ramsay retired after ten years on the Swedish Golf Tour and four years on the Ladies European Tour to become a club pro at her home club, St Arild Golf Club.

Professional wins (6)

LET Access Series wins (2)

Swedish Golf Tour wins (5)

References

External links

Swedish female golfers
Ladies European Tour golfers
Sportspeople from Skåne County
People from Höganäs Municipality
1987 births
Living people